Jared T. Raynor Gilman (born December 28, 1998) is an American actor best known for his role as Sam Shakusky in the 2012 Wes Anderson film Moonrise Kingdom, which earned him a 2013 Young Artist Award nomination as Best Leading Young Actor in a Feature Film.

Personal life
A resident of South Orange, New Jersey, Gilman has attended Chatham Day School and Newark Academy in Livingston, New Jersey. He was on his school's golf club. He currently attends Tisch School of the Arts at New York University.

Career
Gilman got his first professional acting role as Sam Shakusky in Moonrise Kingdom at age 12. In preparation for the film, Gilman studied canoeing, cooking over an open fire, and Clint Eastwood's character in Escape from Alcatraz. In 2016 he appeared in Paterson, once again alongside Kara Hayward.

Gilman has scripted, acted in, and edited his own short action videos.

Gilman has appeared in an outdoor-themed commercial for Verizon Wireless.

Gilman has recently completed the movie Rhino. He plays the lead role of Cy Berger.

Filmography

References

External links
 

1998 births
American male film actors
American male child actors
Living people
Jewish American male actors
Newark Academy alumni
People from South Orange, New Jersey
Male actors from New Jersey
21st-century American male actors
21st-century American Jews